The eastern common cuscus (Phalanger intercastellanus) is a species of marsupial in the family Phalangeridae found in eastern Papua New Guinea. Until recently, it was considered conspecific with P. mimicus, and before that also with P. orientalis.

The eastern common cuscus was introduced by humans into the Aru Islands and parts of northern Australia.

References

Possums
Mammals of Papua New Guinea
Mammals described in 1895
Taxa named by Oldfield Thomas
Taxonomy articles created by Polbot
Marsupials of New Guinea